Giulio Natta (26 February 1903 – 2 May 1979) was an Italian chemical engineer and Nobel laureate. He won a Nobel Prize in Chemistry in 1963 with Karl Ziegler for work on high polymers. He also received a Lomonosov Gold Medal in 1969.

Biography

Early years
Natta was born in Imperia, Italy. He earned his degree in chemical engineering from the Politecnico di Milano university in Milan in 1924. In 1927 he passed the exams for becoming a professor there. From 1929 to 1933, he was also in charge of physical chemistry at the Faculty of Sciences of the University of Milan. In 1933 he became a full professor and the director of the Institute of General Chemistry of Pavia University, where he stayed until 1935. During this time he began using crystallography to elucidate the structures of a wide variety of molecules including phosphine, arsine and others. In that year he was appointed full professor in physical chemistry at the University of Rome.

Career
From 1936 to 1938 he moved as a full professor and director of the Institute of Industrial Chemistry at the Polytechnic Institute of Turin. In 1938 he took over as the head of the Department of chemical engineering at the Politecnico di Milano university, in a somewhat controversial manner, when his predecessor Mario Giacomo Levi was forced to step down because of racial laws against Jews being introduced in Fascist Italy.

Natta's work at Politecnico di Milano led to the improvement of earlier work by Karl Ziegler and to the development of the Ziegler–Natta catalyst. He received the Nobel Prize in Chemistry in 1963 with Karl Ziegler for their research in high polymers.

Personal life

In 1935 Natta married Rosita Beati; a graduate in literature, she coined the terms "isotactic", "atactic" and "syndiotactic" for polymers discovered by her husband. They had two children, Giuseppe and Franca. Rosita died in 1968.

Natta was diagnosed with Parkinson's disease in 1956.  By 1963, his condition had progressed to the point that he required the assistance of his son and four colleagues to present his speech at the Nobel ceremonies in Stockholm.  Natta died in Bergamo, Italy at age 76.

See also
Polypropylene

References

Further reading

External links

  including the Nobel Lecture, December 12, 1963 From the Stereospecific Polymerization to the Asymmetric Autocatalytic Synthesis of Macromolecules

1903 births
1979 deaths
People from Imperia
Polytechnic University of Milan alumni
Neurological disease deaths in Lombardy
Deaths from Parkinson's disease
Italian chemists
Italian chemical engineers
20th-century Italian inventors
Italian Nobel laureates
Nobel laureates in Chemistry
Members of the French Academy of Sciences
Foreign Members of the USSR Academy of Sciences
Polymer scientists and engineers
Academic staff of the Polytechnic University of Milan
Recipients of the Lomonosov Gold Medal
Academic staff of the University of Milan